The Third Culture: Beyond the Scientific Revolution is a 1995 book by John Brockman which discusses the work of several well-known scientists who are directly communicating their new, sometimes provocative, ideas to the general public. John Brockman has continued the themes of 'The Third Culture' in the website of the Edge Foundation, where leading scientists and thinkers contribute their thoughts in plain English.

The title of the book refers to Charles Percy Snow's 1959 work The Two Cultures and the Scientific Revolution, which described the conflict between the cultures of the humanities and science.

Contents 
23 people were included in the 1995 book:
 physicist Paul Davies
 biologist Richard Dawkins 
 philosopher Daniel Dennett
 paleontologist Niles Eldredge
 chaos theorist J. Doyne Farmer
 theoretical physicist Murray Gell-Mann
 biologist Brian Goodwin
 geologist/biologist Stephen Jay Gould
 physicist Alan Guth
 inventor W. Daniel Hillis
 theoretical psychologist Nicholas Humphrey
 geneticist Steve Jones
 biologist Stuart Kauffman
 complex systems specialist Christopher Langton
 biologist Lynn Margulis
 mathematician and computer scientist Marvin Minsky
 mathematical physicist Roger Penrose
 cognitive scientist Steven Pinker
 theoretical astrophysicist Martin Rees
 cognitive scientist Roger Schank
 theoretical physicist Lee Smolin
 biologist Francisco Varela
 evolutionary biologist George C. Williams

The book influenced the reception of popular scientific literature in parts of the world beyond the United States. In Germany, the book inspired several newspapers to integrate scientific reports into their "Feuilleton" or "culture" sections (such as the Frankfurter Allgemeine Zeitung). At the same time, the assertions of the book were discussed as a source of controversy, especially the implicit assertion that "third culture thinking" is mainly an American development. Critics acknowledge that, whereas in the English-speaking cultures there is a large tradition of scientists writing popular books, such tradition was absent for a long period in the German and French languages, with journalists often filling the gap. However, some decades ago there were also scientists, like the physicists Heisenberg and Schrödinger and the psychologist Piaget, who fulfill the criteria Brockman named for "third culture." The German author Gabor Paal suggested that the idea of the "third culture" is a rather modern version of what Hegel called Realphilosophie (philosophy of the real).

Also, already during the interwar period, Otto Neurath and other members of the Vienna Circle strongly propagated the need for both the unity of science and the popularization of new scientific concepts. With the rise of the Nazis in Germany and Austria, many of the Vienna Circle's members left for the United States where they taught in several universities, causing their philosophical ideas to spread in the Anglo-Saxon world throughout the 1930s-1940s.

References
 John Brockman, The Third Culture: Beyond the Scientific Revolution, Simon & Schuster: 1995 
 Gabor Paal, Was ist schön? Ästhetik und Erkenntnis, Koenighausen & Neumann (2003), Würzburg.

Further reading
  Reflections on "the Third Culture" from the editor of Wired.

External links
 3rd Culture at EDGE

1995 non-fiction books
Science books
Science studies

Books by John Brockman
Simon & Schuster books